"Amen" is a song by Slovenian singer Ana Soklič. The song represented Slovenia in the Eurovision Song Contest 2021 in Rotterdam, the Netherlands.

Eurovision Song Contest

Internal selection 
On 16 May 2020, RTV Slovenija confirmed that Ana Soklič would represent Slovenia in the 2021 contest.

Following the announcement of Soklič as the selected artist, composers were able to submit their songs to the broadcaster between 13 July 2020 and 30 September 2020. 191 songs were received by the broadcaster during the submission period. An expert committee consisting of Soklič, Darja Švajger (singer, vocal coach and 1995 and 1999 Slovenian Eurovision entrant) and Vladimir Graić (composer of Serbia's winning Eurovision entry "Molitva" in 2007) shortlisted three songs from the received submissions, with the Slovenian entry being determined by an alternate expert committee consisting of Darja Švajger, Mojca Menart (Head of the publishing business of ZKP RTV Slovenija) and Matevž Šalehar (musician and singer-songwriter) from the three shortlisted songs.

The song was presented during the special show EMA 2021 on 27 February 2021 at the RTV Slovenija Studio 1 in Ljubljana, hosted by Lea Sirk and Nejc Šmit.

At Eurovision 
The 65th edition of the Eurovision Song Contest took place in Rotterdam, the Netherlands and consisted of two semi-finals on 18 May and 20 May 2021, and the grand final on 22 May 2021. Ana Soklič performed in the first half of the first semi-final of the contest, but did not qualify for the final.

Personnel

Production 
 Ana Soklič – composer, lyricist 
 Bojan Simončič – composer
 Charlie Mason – lyricist
 Žiga Pirnat – composer, lyricist, arranger, producer
 Dorian Holley – choral director
 Tony Maserati – sound engineer

Studio recording 
 Ana Soklič – lead vocal
 Žiga Pirnat – orchestra conductor
 RTV Slovenia Symphony Orchestra – musical accompaniment
 American black choir – backvocals
 Perpetuum Jazzile – backvocals (a cappella version)

Tracklist 
Born to the Fight (EP, digital), ZKP RTV Slovenija (label) 
1. "Amen" (extended version) – 3:28
2. "Amen" (RnB Radio remix) – 3:25
3. "Amen" (Summer Vibes remix) – 4:28
4. "Amen" (ft. Perpetuum Jazzile, a cappella) – 3:09
5. "Amen" (original version) – 3:04
6. "Amen" (karaoke version) – 3:04
7. "Voda" (symphonic version) – 3:03

References 

2021 songs
2021 singles
Eurovision songs of 2021
Eurovision songs of Slovenia
Ana Soklič songs
Songs with lyrics by Charlie Mason (lyricist)